The Bulgarian State Television Female Vocal Choir is an internationally renowned world music ensemble that performs modern arrangements of traditional Bulgarian folk melodies. It is most recognized for its contribution to Marcel Cellier's Le Mystère des Voix Bulgares (The Mystery Of The Bulgarian Voices) project. First created in 1952 as the Ensemble for Folk Songs of the Bulgarian Radio by Georgi Boyadjiev, the choir is now under the direction of Dora Hristova. The choir was granted the name Le Mystère des Voix Bulgares by Marcel Cellier in 1997, in recognition of the fact that it had contributed most of the songs on the original compilations.

Membership and methods
Singers are chosen from country villages for the beauty and openness of their voices, and undergo extensive training in the unique, centuries-old singing style. Influenced by Bulgaria's Thracian, Bulgarian, Ottoman and Byzantine history, their music is striking in its use of diaphonic singing and distinctive timbre, as well as its modal scales, unusual meters (such as 7/8, 9/8, and 11/8), and dissonant harmonies (abundant second, seventh, and ninth intervals). All of these are characteristic of Bulgarian folk music.

History
In 1951 Filip Kutev and Maria Kuteva founded the first professional national folk music ensemble in Bulgaria, the State Ensemble for Folk Song and Dance, now known as the Filip Kutev Ensemble. The State Television Choir followed in 1952. Though the latter choir became widely known when the trend-setting English alternative record label 4AD reissued a pair of anthology albums in 1986 and 1988 with the now famous title Le Mystère des Voix Bulgares, their recordings date as far back as 1957. The first pressing of the Voix Bulgares album was the result of 15 years of work by Swiss ethnomusicologist and producer Marcel Cellier and was originally released in 1975 on his Discs Cellier label. Ivo Watts-Russell, the founder of the 4AD Records label, was introduced to the choir by a third- or fourth-generation audio cassette lent to him by Peter Murphy of the band Bauhaus. He became entranced by the music, and tracked down and licensed the recordings from Cellier. They were one of four choirs to appear on the album Le Mystère des Voix Bulgares, Volume Two, This album won Cellier a Grammy Award in 1989. The group has since performed extensively around the world to wide acclaim.

Trio Bulgarka
Three prominent soloists of the group have also performed together as Trio Bulgarka, known in the West primarily for singing on the Kate Bush albums The Sensual World and The Red Shoes. The trio also performed with the Italian rock band Elio e Le Storie Tese on the single Pipppero from the album İtalyan, rum casusu çikti, and has released two albums of its own. The three women in the trio are Stoyanka Boneva from Pirin, Yanka Rupkina from Strandja and Eva Georgieva from Dobrudja.

The Xenaverse connection
The choir became best known in the United States for its contributions to the music of Xena: Warrior Princess, whose theme music Joseph LoDuca developed from "Kaval sviri," one of the Bulgarian folk songs that form the bulk of their repertoire.

Discography

1975 Le Mystère des Voix Bulgares, Compilation, Disques Cellier
1987 Cathedral Concert (Live), PolyGram (re-released in 1992)
1988 Le Mystère des Voix Bulgares, volume II, Disques Cellier
1989 Le Mystère des Voix Bulgares, volume III, Disques Cellier
1993 From Bulgaria with Love: the Pop Album, Rhino/Atlantic
1993 Melody Rhythm & Harmony, Rhino/Atlantic
1994 Ritual, Nonesuch/Elektra
1995 Box Set: Le Mystère des Voix Bulgares, volumes I - II and Ritual, Nonesuch/Elektra
1998 Le Mystère des Voix Bulgares, volume IV, Philips
2001 Bulgarian Custom Songs, Gega
2003 A Portrait of Nikolai Kaufmann, Riva Sound / KVZ Music Ltd.
2008 Music From Alone in the Dark, composed by Olivier Derivière, Milan Records
2017 Le Mystère des Voix Bulgares ft. Lisa Gerrard - Pora Sotunda (Single on a vinyl & digital)
2018 Le Mystère des Voix Bulgares ft. Lisa Gerrard - BooCheeMish (New album)

See also
Music of Bulgaria
Bistritsa Babi
Filip Kutev

References

External links
The Mystery of Bulgarian Voices
4AD Artist page
1988 NY Times concert review
Singers.com listing
Video of performance on Johnny Carson's Tonight Show

Musical groups established in 1952
Bulgarian folk music groups
4AD artists
Bulgarian choirs
Nonesuch Records artists
1952 establishments in Bulgaria
Women's choirs
Culture in Sofia